Langley-on-Tyne is a closed stone built railway station situated on a single track branch railway line in Northumberland, England, that ran from  through the Border Counties Junction to . It is now a cafe and garden

History

Built to carry freight, primarily the product of local lead mines, the line eventually opened to passengers. The passenger service was run by the North Eastern Railway who took over the line in July 1876.

The station was closed to passengers in September 1930, and for freight when line closed on 20 November 1950.

Present day 
The station buildings have been converted into a garden centre and café.

References

External links
Station on Northumbrian Railways
Station on Subterranea Britannica

Former North Eastern Railway (UK) stations
Railway stations in Great Britain opened in 1867
Railway stations in Great Britain closed in 1950
Disused railway stations in Northumberland